Cave5D is an adaptation of Vis5D to the CAVE for immersive virtual reality. It is released under the GNU GPL.

Bibliography
 W. Hibbard, J. Anderson, I. Foster, B. Paul, R. Jacob, C. Schafer, and M. Tyree, Exploring Coupled Atmosphere-Ocean Models Using Vis5D, International Journal of Supercomputer Applications 10, no. 2, 1996, pp. 211–222.
 B. Hibbard, Vis5D, Cave5D, and VisAD, in The Visualization Handbook ed. C. D. Hansen, C. R. Johnson. Elsevier, New York. 2005, pp. 673–688.

References

External links
 Cave5D Home Page
 History of Vis5D and VisAD

Meteorological data and networks
Computational science
Infographics
Free data visualization software
Virtual reality
Scientific visualization
Earth sciences graphics software